The County of Dawson is a county (a cadastral division) in Queensland, Australia, located in the Shire of Banana in Central Queensland.   The county is divided into civil parishes. The county was officially named and bounded by the Governor in Council on 7 March 1901 under the Land Act 1897.

Parishes 
Dawson is divided into parishes, as listed below:

References

External links 

 

Dawson